Kiki Bertens was the defending champion and successfully defended her title, defeating Elena Rybakina in the final, 6–1, 6–3. This would be Bertens' final WTA Tour singles title before her retirement in July 2021.

Seeds

Draw

Finals

Top half

Bottom half

Qualifying

Seeds

Qualifiers

Lucky loser

Qualifying draw

First qualifier

Second qualifier

Third qualifier

Fourth qualifier

Fifth qualifier

Sixth qualifier

References

External Links
 Main draw
 Qualifying draw

St. Petersburg Ladies' Trophy - Singles
St. Petersburg Ladies' Trophy